Dolf Scheeffer (29 November 1907 – 26 October 1966) was a Dutch footballer. He played in one match for the Netherlands national football team in 1927.

References

External links
 

1907 births
1966 deaths
Dutch footballers
Netherlands international footballers
Place of birth missing
Association footballers not categorized by position